Newfield School may refer to:
 Newfield Secondary School, a school in Sheffield, South Yorkshire, England, UK
 Newfield Primary School, a school in Whitfield, Dundee, Scotland, UK
 Newfield High School, a school in Seiden, New York, US

See also
 Newfield (disambiguation)
 Newfield Park Primary School, a school in Halesowen, Dudley, West Midlands, England, UK